Only the Strong Survive is a studio album by the American zydeco musician Keith Frank. It was released in 1996.

Track listing 

All songs written by Keith Frank except "Sweet Soul Music"

"Let Me Be" – 2:45
"Make My Hustle" – 2:25
"Good Music (Sweet Soul Music)" – 3:13
"Reste Dans La Maison" – 2:16
"Bayou Boogie" (Instrumental) – 3:10
"Everywhere I Be" – 2:56
"Knee Cap Shuffle" – 2:50
"Steppin' to the Rhythm" – 2:38
"Good Old Days" – 2:54
"Only the Strong Survive" – 4:09
"There Goes My Baby" – 2:56
"Day-O" – 2:31
"Be Yourself" – 5:42

Personnel 
Keith Frank – accordion, vocals
Jennifer Frank – bass, backing vocals, lead vocals on "Only the Strong Survive"
Brad Frank – drums
George Attale – lead guitar
Eric "Ice" Cole – rub board

References

1996 albums
Keith Frank albums
Zydeco albums